Igor Džundev (born 12 June 1963) is Macedonian ambassador and the Permanent Representative of Republic of Macedonia to the United Nations. He was formerly the State Secretary in the Republic of Macedonia's Ministry of Foreign Affairs.

Džundev presented his credentials to the Secretary-General of the United Nations on 17 September 2004.

References

1963 births
Living people
Macedonian diplomats
Permanent Representatives of North Macedonia to the United Nations
Foreign Ministers of North Macedonia